Dichorragia is a genus of butterflies in the family Nymphalidae (subfamily Cyrestinae)

Species
Dichorragia nesimachus (Doyère, [1840])
Dichorragia ninus (C. & R. Felder, 1859)
 D. n. ninas Moluccas
 D. n. distinctus Röber, 1894 New Guinea
 D. n. buruensis Joicey & Talbot, 1924 Buru

References

"Dichorragia Butler, [1869]" at Markku Savela's Lepidoptera and Some Other Life Forms

External links
Images representing Dichorragia at Consortium for the Barcode of Life

Cyrestinae
Nymphalidae genera